Vitas Gerulaitis won in the final 6–4, 4–6, 6–3, 6–3 against John McEnroe.

Players

Draw

Finals

Group A

Group B

References

Toronto Molson Light
Toronto Molson Light
1981 in Canadian tennis
Toronto Indoor